Liberty Puzzles is an American manufacturer of classic style wooden jigsaw puzzles based in Boulder, Colorado.

History 
Liberty Puzzles was founded in 2005 by Christopher Wirth and his business partner Jeffrey Eldridge, after Wirth’s family inherited several hand-cut wooden puzzles from the 1930s. Surprised by the value of hand-cut wooden jigsaw puzzles (which can sell for more than $1,000 each), Wirth decided to start a business using modern cutting technologies, with a goal of producing puzzles in the $100 range. Wirth is the son of former Colorado senator Tim Wirth. 

Liberty Puzzles was the largest or second largest wooden jigsaw puzzle manufacturer in America as of 2011. In 2014, the company opened a retail location on the Pearl Street Mall in Boulder. Liberty Puzzles experienced a surge in popularity during the early days of the covid-19 pandemic, and was forced to institute a waiting list to purchase puzzles of up to 60 days.

The puzzles are made in Boulder with archival paper and inks adhered to quarter-inch maple plywood cut with computer-controlled laser cutters. As of 2020, the company owned 44 laser cutters, each capable of producing a 500-piece puzzle each hour.

Designs 
The company offers over 650 different puzzle images. The image selections have an emphasis on fine art, vintage prints and Asian art. The puzzle designs are modeled after the puzzles popular in the early-twentieth century. Liberty's puzzles include a relatively large number of whimsy pieces (pieces shaped recognizably, for example, as storks or swans), reaching over 20% of the pieces in some puzzles. Most Liberty Puzzles include the company's signature whimsy piece in the shape of an eagle.

References

External link
Liberty Puzzles official website

Toy companies of the United States
Wooden toys
Companies established in 2005
Manufacturing companies based in Boulder, Colorado
Jigsaw puzzle manufacturers